Hastings Schoolhouse, also known as Washington Township District No. 12 , was a historic one-room school building located half a mile south of the intersection of E Hacker Creek and Liberty Church Roads in Martinsville, Morgan County, Indiana on the property of the Maxwell Farm. It was built in 1870, and was a one-story, gable front, rectangular brick building.  It measured 22 feet by 33 feet. The building was damaged by a windstorm in 2001, knocking down one of the walls. It has been demolished.

It was listed on the National Register of Historic Places in 1999 and delisted in 2004.

References

Former National Register of Historic Places in Indiana
School buildings on the National Register of Historic Places in Indiana
One-room schoolhouses in Indiana
School buildings completed in 1870
Buildings and structures in Morgan County, Indiana
National Register of Historic Places in Morgan County, Indiana